The Athenic-class ocean liners were a three ship class of ocean liners built by the Harland & Wolff shipyard for the White Star Line in the early 20th century.

Both were launched in 1902. The Athenic was launched as a dual purpose cargo/passenger ship. The last ship, was launched one year later. In the First World War, all three ships were used as troop transports. Their route was from Liverpool to New Zealand. In 1928, the Athenic was sold to a Norwegian firm and converted into a whaling ship. The SS Corinthic was scrapped in 1931. In the Second World War, the Athenic was torpedoed twice and sunk by  but later she was raised and returned to her owner. She was scrapped in 1962. In 1934, the Ionic was sold to the Shaw, Savill & Albion Line and was scrapped two years later.

References
 Athenic-class ocean liners at ssMaritime.com

Ships of the White Star Line
Ocean liner classes